Norman Foster,  (born February 14, 1949) is a Canadian playwright, considered to be Canada's most produced playwright. Foster discovered his talents as a playwright in Fredericton, New Brunswick, while he was working as host of a popular morning radio show. He accompanied a friend (Peter Spurway) to an audition, and landed his first acting job, as Elwood P. Dowd in Harvey, without ever having even seeing a play. Intrigued with the theatre, he set his pen to paper and wrote his first play titled Sinners.

In 1983 and 1984, Theatre New Brunswick mounted the first professional productions of Sinners and Foster's  next play The Melville Boys. In the years following, TNB introduced My Darling Judith (1987), The Affections of May (1990), The Motor Trade (1991), Wrong for Each Other (1992), and Office Hours (1996).

An extremely prolific writer, Foster has had more than fifty plays produced on professional stages. Other well-known plays include The Love List,  The Long Weekend; Bedtime Stories; Kiss the Moon, Kiss the Sun; Storm Warning; Skin Flick; Outlaw; Hilda's Yard; On A First Name Basis; Old Love; Mending Fences, Here on the Flight Path, The Foursome and The Ladies Foursome. Frequently compared to American playwright Neil Simon, Foster pens plays that are known for their humour, accessibility, and insight into the everyday tribulations of life.   Foster's work is frequently produced by theatre groups across North America, and as far away from his home in Canada as Canberra and Perth (https://www.broadwayworld.com/perth/article/Harbour-Theatre-Presents-THE-LADIES-FOURSOME-20210212), Australia. Beginning in June 2016, The Norm Foster Theatre Festival in St. Catharines, Ontario celebrated the work of this Canadian playwright.

The Playwrights Guild of Canada awarded him lifetime membership in 2016.

In December 2016, Foster was named an Officer of the Order of Canada.

In 2018, he was awarded the key to the city in St. Catharines, Ontario.

He also acts, often in his own work. For example, he appears as Jonas in some productions of Jonas & Barry in the Home.

References

20th-century Canadian dramatists and playwrights
21st-century Canadian dramatists and playwrights
Living people
1949 births
People from Newmarket, Ontario
Writers from Ontario
Canadian male dramatists and playwrights
20th-century Canadian male writers
21st-century Canadian male writers
Officers of the Order of Canada